Rhys Williams (born August 24, 1983 in Calgary, Alberta) is a Canadian actor and stunt performer. During 2010, he appeared as Gavin in three episodes of The CW TV series Life Unexpected.

Williams also doubled for Matt Ward in two episodes of the CW TV series Supernatural, and for Nick Cannon in the motion picture Underclassman.

Filmography (actor)

Television
Life Unexpected (2010)
Under (2008) 
Fallen (2006) 
The L Word (2008) 
Kyle XY (2006) 
Supernatural (2005) 
Still Life (2004) 
Odyssey 5 (2002) 
Holiday Heart (2000) 
The Immortal (2000) 
Frankie & Hazel (2000) 
The Famous Jett Jackson (2000)
So Weird (1999)
The Color of Courage (1999) 
The Sentinel (2 episodes, 1996–1997) 
In Cold Blood (1996)Highlander: The Series (1996)

FilmWhite House Down (2013)Rags (2012)Hot Tub Time Machine (2010) Air Bud: Golden Receiver (1998) Man with a Gun (1995)

Filmography (stunt performer)
TelevisionFacing Kate (2010) Stargate Universe (2010) Supernatural (3 episodes, 2007-2010)Human Target (2010)Just a Phase (2006)The Robinsons: Lost in Space (2004)

FilmThe Cabin in the Woods (2011) Percy Jackson & the Olympians: The Lightning Thief (2010)Aliens vs. Predator: Requiem (2007)Like Mike 2: Streetball (2006) Underclassman (2005)Suicide Squad'' (2016)

References

Canadian male film actors
Canadian male television actors
1983 births
Living people
Male actors from Calgary